Zsolt Bedák (born 26 September 1983 in Budapest, Hungary) is a Hungarian boxer. His younger brother Pál Bedák is a flyweight boxer.

Amateur career
2001 Bedák won bronze at the European Junior Championships.
Member of the Hungarian Olympic Team of 2004 Athens in Bantamweight. He qualified for the 2004 Summer Olympics by ending up in first place at the 1st AIBA European 2004 Olympic Qualifying Tournament in Plovdiv, Bulgaria.
2004 Olympic Results – Boxed as a Bantamweight (51 kg)
Round of 32 – Defeated Abner Mares of Mexico, 36-27
Round of 16 – Lost to Maksym Tretyak of Ukraine, 24-27
In 2005 he competed for Romania at the Boxing World Cup in Moscow, Russia, losing his first match but winning his second in the preliminary round.
2006 he won the bronze medal at the 2006 European Amateur Boxing Championships in Plovdiv.

Professional career
He turned pro in 2006 and signed a contract to fight for Hamburg-based Universum Box-Promotion. After winning his first 12 fights, in 2009 he won the WBO European super bantamweight title and later also the WBO Inter-Continental super bantamweight title. In 2010 May he fought Wilfredo Vázquez, Jr. for the WBO super bantamweight title but lost by TKO in the 10th round.

External links
 
Bedák on Boxing.de

1983 births
Living people
Boxers at the 2004 Summer Olympics
Olympic boxers of Hungary
Hungarian male boxers
Bantamweight boxers
Boxers from Budapest